George Kenneth Rayborn (born November 22, 1974 in Hattiesburg, Mississippi) is a former professional baseball player. Rayborn was drafted by the Seattle Mariners in the 67th round of the 1993 Major League Baseball draft, but did not sign. He was later drafted by the Boston Red Sox in the 17th round of the 1997 Major League Baseball draft, and did sign. Rayborn played in the Red Sox minor league system in 1997 and 1998, then played for the Greenville Bluesmen of the Texas–Louisiana League in 1999.

From 2000 to 2005, he played in the Mariners and Cleveland Indians minor league systems and in independent baseball. Raymond played for the Hiroshima Toyo Carp of the Japanese Central League in 2005 and the SK Wyverns of the Korea Baseball Organization in 2007 and 2008. He played for the Southern Maryland Blue Crabs in the Atlantic League in 2009 and 2010.

External links

Career statistics and player information from Korea Baseball Organization

1974 births
American expatriate baseball players in Japan
American expatriate baseball players in South Korea
American expatriate baseball players in Taiwan
Baseball players from Mississippi
Greenville Bluesmen players
Hiroshima Toyo Carp players
KBO League pitchers
Living people
SSG Landers players
Southern Maryland Blue Crabs players
Sportspeople from Hattiesburg, Mississippi